Jean Alexandre Deretti (born 1 May 1993), known as Jean Deretti, is a Brazilian professional footballer who plays as an attacking midfielder.

Career
In January 2017, Deretti signed for Dila Gori.

Career statistics

Honours
Joinville
Brazilian Série B: 2014

References

External links
Jean Deretti at Portal Oficial do Grêmio

1993 births
Living people
Sportspeople from Santa Catarina (state)
Brazilian footballers
Brazil youth international footballers
Association football midfielders
Campeonato Brasileiro Série A players
Campeonato Brasileiro Série B players
Figueirense FC players
Grêmio Foot-Ball Porto Alegrense players
Joinville Esporte Clube players
Mogi Mirim Esporte Clube players
Ypiranga Futebol Clube players
Erovnuli Liga players
FC Dila Gori players
Slovak Super Liga players
FK Senica players
Liga I players
LPS HD Clinceni players
Liga II players
FC Politehnica Iași (2010) players
Brazilian expatriate footballers
Brazilian expatriate sportspeople in Georgia (country)
Expatriate footballers in Georgia (country)
Brazilian expatriate sportspeople in Slovakia
Expatriate footballers in Slovakia
Brazilian expatriate sportspeople in Romania
Expatriate footballers in Romania
Brazilian people of Italian descent